The ZZ-R1100 or ZX-11  is a sport bike in Kawasaki's Ninja series made from 1990 to 2001, as the successor to the 1988–1990 Tomcat ZX-10. It was marketed as the ZX-11 Ninja in North America and the ZZ-R1100 in the rest of the world. The C-model ran from 1990 to 1993 while the D-model ran from 1993 to 2001, when it was replaced by the ZZ-R1200 (ZX-12C) 2002-2005

Competition for fastest production motorcycle
With a record top speed of  the ZX-11 was the fastest production motorcycle for six years, from its introduction in 1990 through 1995, when it was surpassed by the 1996 Honda CBR1100XX. When the bike was introduced in 1990, the nearest production bike top speed was   slower and it belonged to the ZX-10, the bike that Kawasaki was replacing with the ZX-11. The ZX-11 also had a ram air induction system. The 1990 ZX-11 C1 model got a Ram-air intake, the very first on any production motorcycle.

In 2000 the Kawasaki Ninja ZX-12R was introduced. The ZX-12R was designed to be more of a pure sportbike. It was much anticipated since the Suzuki GSX1300R Hayabusa held the title for fastest production bike when it was introduced in 1999. European governments threatened to ban high speed motorcycles, leading Kawasaki to de-tune the ZX-12R prior to its release.

In 2002 the Kawasaki ZZ-R1200 was released, which is a sport tourer and more akin to the ZX-11.

See also 
List of fastest production motorcycles by acceleration

Notes

 

 
 

Ninja ZX-11
Sport bikes
Sport touring motorcycles
Motorcycles introduced in 1990